Carnegie station is an at-grade busway station operated by Pittsburgh Regional Transit in Carnegie, Pennsylvania. The station is located at the southern terminus of the West Busway and is only served by route G2 West Busway-All Stops. Route G31 Bridgeville Flyer enters and exits the busway just north of this station at Campbells Run Road/Chartiers Avenue and makes stops nearby.

The station has a 215-space park and ride lot.

References 

Port Authority of Allegheny County stations
Bus stations in Pennsylvania
West Busway